The following outline is provided as an overview of and topical guide to the U.S. state of Alabama:

Alabama – 22nd U.S. state to be admitted to the Union, which is located in the South. It is bordered by Tennessee to the north, Georgia to the east, Florida and the Gulf of Mexico to the south, and Mississippi to the west. Alabama is a major producer of chickens, which accounts for almost half of the state's agriculture.

General reference 

 Names
 Common name: Alabama
 Pronunciation: 
 Official name: State of Alabama
 Abbreviations and name codes
 Postal symbol:  AL
 ISO 3166-2 code:  US-AL
 Internet second-level domain:  .al.us
 Nicknames
Cotton Plantation State
Cotton State
 Heart of Dixie
 Lizard State
 Yellowhammer State
 Camellia State
 Adjectival: Alabama
 Demonyms
 Alabamian
 Alabaman

Geography of Alabama 

Geography of Alabama
 Alabama is: a U.S. state, a federal state of the United States of America
 Location
 Northern Hemisphere
 Western Hemisphere
 Americas
 North America
 Anglo America
 Northern America
 United States of America
 Contiguous United States
 Central United States
 East South Central States
 Southern United States
 Deep South
 Gulf Coast of the United States
 Southeastern United States
 Population of Alabama: 4,779,736 (2010 U.S. Census)
 Area of Alabama:
 Atlas of Alabama

Places in Alabama 
 List of places in Alabama
 List of places in Alabama: A–C
 List of places in Alabama: D–H
 List of places in Alabama: I–M
 List of places in Alabama: N–R
 List of places in Alabama: S–Z
 Historic places in Alabama
 Ghost towns in Alabama
 National Historic Landmarks in Alabama
 National Register of Historic Places listings in Alabama
 Bridges on the National Register of Historic Places in Alabama
 National Natural Landmarks in Alabama
 State parks in Alabama
 Properties on the Alabama Register of Landmarks and Heritage
 Properties on the Alabama Register of Landmarks and Heritage by county (Autauga–Choctaw)
 Properties on the Alabama Register of Landmarks and Heritage by county (Clarke–Dallas)
 Properties on the Alabama Register of Landmarks and Heritage by county (DeKalb–Jackson)
 Properties on the Alabama Register of Landmarks and Heritage by county (Jefferson–Macon)
 Properties on the Alabama Register of Landmarks and Heritage by county (Madison–Perry)
 Properties on the Alabama Register of Landmarks and Heritage by county (Pickens–Winston)

Environment of Alabama
 Climate of Alabama
 Geology of Alabama
 Protected areas in Alabama
 State forests of Alabama
 List of nature centers in Alabama
 Superfund sites in Alabama
 Wildlife of Alabama
 Fauna of Alabama
 Amphibians of Alabama
 Mammals of Alabama
 Reptiles of Alabama
Flora of Alabama
 Botanical gardens and arboretums in Alabama
 Trees of Alabama

Natural geographic features of Alabama
 Islands of Alabama
 Lakes of Alabama
 Mountain passes in Alabama
 Rivers of Alabama

Regions of Alabama
North Alabama
Central Alabama
South Alabama
Black Belt
Lower Alabama
Mobile Bay

Metropolitan areas of Alabama 

Metropolitan areas of Alabama
Metropolitan areas of Alabama, ranked by size:

 Birmingham
 Mobile
 Huntsville
 Montgomery
 Tuscaloosa
 Decatur
 Florence-Muscle Shoals
 Dothan
 Auburn
 Anniston-Oxford
 Gadsden

Administrative divisions of Alabama 

Types of administrative divisions in Alabama:
 Alabama's congressional districts
 The 67 counties of the state of Alabama
 Cities in Alabama

Alabama Congressional districts 

Alabama's congressional districts
 Alabama's 1st congressional district
 Alabama's 2nd congressional district
 Alabama's 3rd congressional district
 Alabama's 4th congressional district
 Alabama's 5th congressional district
 Alabama's 6th congressional district
 Alabama's 7th congressional district
 Alabama's 8th congressional district
 Alabama's 9th congressional district
 Alabama's 10th congressional district
 Alabama's at-large congressional district

Counties of Alabama 

 Autauga County, Alabama
 Baldwin County, Alabama
 Barbour County, Alabama
 Bibb County, Alabama
 Blount County, Alabama
 Bullock County, Alabama
 Butler County, Alabama
 Calhoun County, Alabama
 Chambers County, Alabama
 Cherokee County, Alabama
 Chilton County, Alabama
 Choctaw County, Alabama
 Clarke County, Alabama
 Clay County, Alabama
 Cleburne County, Alabama
 Coffee County, Alabama
 Colbert County, Alabama
 Conecuh County, Alabama
 Coosa County, Alabama
 Covington County, Alabama
 Crenshaw County, Alabama
 Cullman County, Alabama
 Dale County, Alabama
 Dallas County, Alabama
 DeKalb County, Alabama
 Elmore County, Alabama
 Escambia County, Alabama
 Etowah County, Alabama
 Fayette County, Alabama
 Franklin County, Alabama
 Geneva County, Alabama
 Greene County, Alabama
 Hale County, Alabama
 Henry County, Alabama
 Houston County, Alabama
 Jackson County, Alabama
 Jefferson County, Alabama
 Lamar County, Alabama
 Lauderdale County, Alabama
 Lawrence County, Alabama
 Lee County, Alabama
 Limestone County, Alabama
 Lowndes County, Alabama
 Macon County, Alabama
 Madison County, Alabama
 Marengo County, Alabama
 Marion County, Alabama
 Marshall County, Alabama
 Mobile County, Alabama
 Monroe County, Alabama
 Montgomery County, Alabama
 Morgan County, Alabama
 Perry County, Alabama
 Pickens County, Alabama
 Pike County, Alabama
 Randolph County, Alabama
 Russell County, Alabama
 Shelby County, Alabama
 St. Clair County, Alabama
 Sumter County, Alabama
 Talladega County, Alabama
 Tallapoosa County, Alabama
 Tuscaloosa County, Alabama
 Walker County, Alabama
 Washington County, Alabama
 Wilcox County, Alabama
 Winston County, Alabama

Municipalities in Alabama 

 Cities in Alabama (10 with largest population included below)
 State capital of Alabama: Montgomery
 City nicknames in Alabama
 Auburn, Alabama
 Birmingham, Alabama
 Decatur, Alabama
 Dothan, Alabama
 Hoover, Alabama
 Huntsville, Alabama
 Madison, Alabama
 Mobile, Alabama
 Montgomery, Alabama
 St. Stephens, Alabama
 Tuscaloosa, Alabama

Demography of Alabama 

Demographics of Alabama

Government and politics of Alabama 

 Form of government: U.S. state government
 United States congressional delegations from Alabama
 Alabama State Capitol
 Elections in Alabama
 Electoral reform in Alabama
 United States House of Representatives elections in Alabama, 2006
 United States House of Representatives elections in Alabama, 2008
 United States House of Representatives elections in Alabama, 2010
 United States House of Representatives elections in Alabama, 2012
 United States House of Representatives elections in Alabama, 2014
 United States House of Representatives elections in Alabama, 2016
 United States Senate election in Alabama, 1930
 United States Senate election in Alabama, 1980
 United States Senate election in Alabama, 1986
 United States Senate election in Alabama, 1990
 United States Senate election in Alabama, 1992
 United States Senate election in Alabama, 1996
 United States Senate election in Alabama, 1998
 United States Senate election in Alabama, 2002
 United States Senate election in Alabama, 2004
 United States Senate election in Alabama, 2008
 United States Senate election in Alabama, 2010
 United States Senate election in Alabama, 2014
 United States Senate election in Alabama, 2016
 United States presidential election in Alabama, 1824
 United States presidential election in Alabama, 1828
 United States presidential election in Alabama, 1832
 United States presidential election in Alabama, 1836
 United States presidential election in Alabama, 1840
 United States presidential election in Alabama, 1844
 United States presidential election in Alabama, 1848
 United States presidential election in Alabama, 1920
 United States presidential election in Alabama, 1960
 United States presidential election in Alabama, 1964
 United States presidential election in Alabama, 1968
 United States presidential election in Alabama, 1972
 United States presidential election in Alabama, 1976
 United States presidential election in Alabama, 1980
 United States presidential election in Alabama, 1984
 United States presidential election in Alabama, 1988
 United States presidential election in Alabama, 1992
 United States presidential election in Alabama, 1996
 United States presidential election in Alabama, 2000
 United States presidential election in Alabama, 2004
 United States presidential election in Alabama, 2008
 United States presidential election in Alabama, 2012
 United States presidential election in Alabama, 2016

Branches of the government of Alabama 

Government of Alabama

Executive branch of the government of Alabama 
Governor of Alabama
Lieutenant Governor of Alabama
 Secretary of State of Alabama
 State departments
 Alabama Department of Transportation
 Alabama Department of Agriculture and Industries
 Alabama Department of Archives and History
 Alabama Department of Conservation and Natural Resources
 Alabama Department of Corrections
 Alabama Department of Education
 Alabama Department of Environmental Management
 Alabama Department of Homeland Security
 Alabama Department of Mental Health
 Alabama Department of Public Health
 Alabama Department of Public Safety
 Alabama Department of Transportation
 Alabama Department of Youth Services

Legislative branch of the government of Alabama 

 Alabama Legislature (bicameral)
 Upper house: Alabama Senate
 Lower house: Alabama House of Representatives

Judicial branch of the government of Alabama

Courts of Alabama
 Supreme Court of Alabama
 United States District Court for the Middle District of Alabama
 United States District Court for the Northern District of Alabama
 United States District Court for the Southern District of Alabama

Law and order in Alabama
 Cannabis in Alabama
 Capital punishment in Alabama
 Individuals executed in Alabama
 Constitution of Alabama
 Crime in Alabama
 Gun laws in Alabama
 Law enforcement in Alabama
 Law enforcement agencies in Alabama
 List of Alabama state prisons
 Same-sex marriage in Alabama

Military in Alabama
 Alabama Air National Guard
 Alabama Army National Guard

History of Alabama

History of Alabama

History of Alabama, by period 
 Prehistory of Alabama
 Spanish colony of Florida, 1565–1763
 French colony of Louisiane, 1699–1763
 British Colony of Georgia, 1732–1776
 French and Indian War, 1754–1763
 Treaty of Paris of 1763
 British Colony of West Florida, 1763–1783
 British Indian Reserve, 1763–1783
 Royal Proclamation of 1763
 American Revolutionary War, April 19, 1775 – September 3, 1783
 United States Declaration of Independence, July 4, 1776
 Treaty of Paris, September 3, 1783
 Territorial claims of State of South Carolina along 35th parallel north, 1776–1787
 Territorial claims of State of Georgia from 31st parallel north to 35th parallel north, 1776–1802
 Spanish colony of Florida Occidental, 1783–1821
 Treaty of San Lorenzo of 1795
 Republic of West Florida, 1810
 Territory of Mississippi, 1798–1817
 War of 1812, June 18, 1812 – March 23, 1815
 United States unilaterally annexes Mobile District of Spanish Florida Occidental, 1812
 Treaty of Ghent, December 24, 1814
 Creek War, 1813–1814
 Territory of Alabama, 1817–1819
 History of slavery in Alabama
 Adams-Onís Treaty of 1819
 State of Alabama becomes 22nd state admitted to the United States of America on December 14, 1819
 Trail of Tears, 1830–1838
 Mexican–American War, April 25, 1846 – February 2, 1848
 Fourth state to declare secession from the United States of America on January 11, 1861
 Founding state of the Confederate States of America on February 8, 1861
 American Civil War, April 12, 1861 – May 13, 1865
 Alabama in the American Civil War
 Battle of Day's Gap, April 30, 1863
 Battle of Athens, January 26, 1864
 Battle of Mobile Bay, August 2–23, 1864
 Franklin-Nashville Campaign, October 5 – December 25, 1864
 Battle of Decatur, October 26–29, 1864
 Battle of Spanish Fort, March 27 – April 8, 1865
 Battle of Selma, April 2, 1865
 Battle of Fort Blakely, April 2–9, 1865
 Alabama in Reconstruction, 1865–1868
 Seventh former Confederate state readmitted to the United States of America on July 13, 1868
 Historical Panorama of Alabama Agriculture, October 2–7, 1939
 Civil Rights Movement from December 1, 1955, to January 20, 1969
 Montgomery bus boycott, December 1, 1955 – December 20, 1956
 Birmingham campaign, spring, 1963
 Selma to Montgomery marches, March 7–25, 1965

History of Alabama, by region

History of Alabama, by county 

 History of Autauga County, Alabama
 History of Baldwin County, Alabama
 History of Barbour County, Alabama
 History of Bibb County, Alabama
 History of Blount County, Alabama
 History of Bullock County, Alabama
 History of Butler County, Alabama
 History of Calhoun County, Alabama
 History of Chambers County, Alabama
 History of Cherokee County, Alabama
 History of Chilton County, Alabama
 History of Choctaw County, Alabama
 History of Clarke County, Alabama
 History of Clay County, Alabama
 History of Cleburne County, Alabama
 History of Coffee County, Alabama
 History of Colbert County, Alabama
 History of Conecuh County, Alabama
 History of Coosa County, Alabama
 History of Covington County, Alabama
 History of Crenshaw County, Alabama
 History of Cullman County, Alabama
 History of Dale County, Alabama
 History of Dallas County, Alabama
 History of DeKalb County, Alabama
 History of Elmore County, Alabama
 History of Escambia County, Alabama
 History of Etowah County, Alabama
 History of Fayette County, Alabama
 History of Franklin County, Alabama
 History of Geneva County, Alabama
 History of Greene County, Alabama
 History of Hale County, Alabama
 History of Henry County, Alabama
 History of Houston County, Alabama
 History of Jackson County, Alabama
 History of Jefferson County, Alabama
 History of Lamar County, Alabama
 History of Lauderdale County, Alabama
 History of Lawrence County, Alabama
 History of Lee County, Alabama
 History of Limestone County, Alabama
 History of Lowndes County, Alabama
 History of Macon County, Alabama
 History of Madison County, Alabama
 History of Marengo County, Alabama
 History of Marion County, Alabama
 History of Marshall County, Alabama
 History of Mobile County, Alabama
 History of Monroe County, Alabama
 History of Montgomery County, Alabama
 History of Morgan County, Alabama
 History of Perry County, Alabama
 History of Pickens County, Alabama
 History of Pike County, Alabama
 History of Randolph County, Alabama
 History of Russell County, Alabama
 History of Shelby County, Alabama
 History of St. Clair County, Alabama
 History of Sumter County, Alabama
 History of Talladega County, Alabama
 History of Tallapoosa County, Alabama
 History of Tuscaloosa County, Alabama
 History of Walker County, Alabama
 History of Washington County, Alabama
 History of Wilcox County, Alabama
 History of Winston County, Alabama

History of Alabama, by city 
 History of Auburn, Alabama
 History of Birmingham, Alabama
 History of Decatur, Alabama
 History of Dothan, Alabama
 History of Hoover, Alabama
 History of Huntsville, Alabama
 History of Madison, Alabama
 History of Mobile, Alabama
 History of sports in Mobile, Alabama
 History of Montgomery, Alabama
 Browder v. Gayle
 Montgomery bus boycott
 Civil Rights Memorial
 How Long, Not Long
 Lehman Brothers
 Lightning Route
 Mid-November 2006 tornado outbreak
 Montgomery Convention
 Montgomery Improvement Association
 Montgomery and West Point Railroad
 Selma to Montgomery marches
 Women's Political Council
 Wright Flying School
 History of St. Stephens, Alabama
 History of Tuscaloosa, Alabama

History of Alabama, by subject 
 List of the oldest buildings in Alabama
 History of the Alabama Cooperative Extension System
 History of slavery in Alabama
 History of sports in Alabama
 History of sports in Mobile, Alabama
 History of universities in Alabama
 History of the University of West Alabama
 History of the University of North Alabama
 History of the University of Alabama

Culture of Alabama 
 Architecture in Alabama
 List of oldest buildings in Alabama
 List of tallest buildings in Alabama
 Museums in Alabama
 Religion in Alabama
 The Church of Jesus Christ of Latter-day Saints in Alabama
 Episcopal Diocese of Alabama
 Scouting in Alabama
 State symbols of Alabama
 Flag of the State of Alabama 
 Great Seal of the State of Alabama

The arts in Alabama 
 Music of Alabama

Sports in Alabama 

Sports in Alabama
 Professional sports teams in Alabama

College sports in Alabama 
 Alabama Crimson Tide
 Alabama Crimson Tide baseball
 Alabama Crimson Tide bowl games
 Alabama Crimson Tide football
 Alabama Crimson Tide football All-Americans
 Alabama Crimson Tide football seasons
 Alabama Crimson Tide football under Nick Saban
 Alabama Crimson Tide head football coaches
 Alabama Crimson Tide home football stadiums
 Alabama Crimson Tide players in the College Football Hall of Fame
 Alabama Crimson Tide players in the College Football Hall of Fame
 Alabama Crimson Tide players in the NFL draft
 Alabama Crimson Tide starting quarterbacks
 Alabama Crimson Tide golf
 Alabama Crimson Tide men's basketball
 Alabama Crimson Tide softball
 Alabama Crimson Tide women's basketball
 Alabama Crimson Tide women's gymnastics
 Alabama Crimson Tide women's soccer
 Alabama Crimson Tide women's volleyball
 Indy Grand Prix of Alabama
 2010 Indy Grand Prix of Alabama
 2011 Indy Grand Prix of Alabama
 2012 Indy Grand Prix of Alabama
 2013 Honda Indy Grand Prix of Alabama
 2014 Honda Indy Grand Prix of Alabama
 2015 Honda Indy Grand Prix of Alabama
 Alabama High School Athletic Association championships
 Alabama State Hornets in the NFL draft

Economy and infrastructure of Alabama 

Economy of Alabama
 Agriculture in Alabama
 Fishing in Alabama
 Communications in Alabama
 Newspapers in Alabama
 Radio stations in Alabama
 Television stations in Alabama
 Energy in Alabama
 Power stations in Alabama
 Solar power in Alabama
 Health care in Alabama
 Hospitals in Alabama

Transportation in Alabama 

Transportation in Alabama
 Airports in Alabama
 East and West Railroad of Alabama
 Interstate 10 in Alabama
 Interstate 20 in Alabama
 Interstate 65 in Alabama
 Interstate 85 in Alabama
 List of Alabama railroads
 List of Interstate Highways in Alabama
 List of U.S. Highways in Alabama
 List of state highways in Alabama
 U.S. Route 278 in Alabama
 U.S. Route 431 in Alabama
 Vehicle registration plates of Alabama
 Western Railway of Alabama

Education in Alabama 

Education in Alabama
 Schools in Alabama
 School districts in Alabama
 High schools in Alabama
 Colleges and universities in Alabama
 Alabama State University
 University of Alabama
 A-Day (University of Alabama)
 University of Alabama System
 University of Alabama at Birmingham
 List of University of Alabama at Birmingham people
 University of Alabama in Huntsville
 University of Alabama in Huntsville shooting
 University of Alabama departments
 University of Alabama College of Communication and Information Sciences
 University of Alabama School of Dentistry
 University of Alabama School of Law
 University of Alabama School of Medicine
 University of Alabama Arboretum
 University of Alabama fraternities and sororities
 University of Alabama Observatories
 University of Alabama Observatory
 Old University of Alabama Observatory
 List of University of Alabama people
 Presidents of the University of Alabama
 President's Mansion (University of Alabama)
 University of Alabama Press
 University of Alabama Quad
 University of Alabama traditions
 University of North Alabama
 University of North Alabama Planetarium and Observatory
 University of North Alabama President's Home
 University of South Alabama
 University of West Alabama

Publications about Alabama 
 Encyclopedia of Alabama

See also

Topic overview:
Alabama

Index of Alabama-related articles

 Gun laws in Alabama
 Attorney General of Alabama
 Cannabis in Alabama
 Coat of arms of Alabama
 African Americans in Alabama

 Aviation in Alabama
 List of Baptist churches in Alabama
 Roman Catholic Diocese of Birmingham in Alabama
 Association of Alabama Camps
 Blue Cross and Blue Shield of Alabama
 Canebrake (region of Alabama)
 CenturyTel of Alabama
 Children's of Alabama
 Crazy in Alabama
 Echota Cherokee Tribe of Alabama
 Effects of Hurricane Dennis in Alabama
 Flag of Alabama
 Flower from the Fields of Alabama
 Grand Lodge of Alabama
 Hispanic Interest Coalition of Alabama
 History of Baptists in Alabama
 Honda Manufacturing of Alabama
 Iron & Steel Museum of Alabama
 LGBT rights in Alabama
 Libertarian Party of Alabama
 List of Alabama Civil War Confederate units
 List of Alabama Union Civil War regiments
 List of Alabama area codes
 List of Alabama companies
 List of Alabama state symbols
 List of Alabama tornado events
 List of Alabama–Huntsville Chargers men's ice hockey seasons
 List of Carnegie libraries in Alabama
 List of governors of Alabama
 List of United States federal courthouses in Alabama
 List of breweries in Alabama
 List of casinos in Alabama
 List of census county divisions in Alabama
 List of census-designated places in Alabama
 List of cities and towns in Alabama
 List of city nicknames in Alabama
 List of college athletic programs in Alabama
 List of county courthouses in Alabama
 List of covered bridges in Alabama
 List of dams and reservoirs in Alabama
 List of fossiliferous stratigraphic units in Alabama
 List of hiking trails in Alabama
 List of law schools in Alabama
 List of lieutenant governors of Alabama
 List of lighthouses in Alabama
 List of metropolitan areas of Alabama
 List of people executed in Alabama
 List of place names in Alabama of Native American origin
 List of plantations in Alabama
 List of shopping malls in Alabama
 List of television stations in Alabama (by channel number)
 List of television stations in Alabama by city of license
 List of unincorporated communities in Alabama
 Live at the Apollo (Ben Harper and The Blind Boys of Alabama)
 Live in Alabama & More
 Loveman's of Alabama
 My Home's in Alabama
 My Home's in Alabama (song)
 National Democratic Party of Alabama
 National Register of Historic Places Multiple Property Submissions in Alabama
 Paleontology in Alabama
 Poet Laureate of Alabama
 Retirement Systems of Alabama
 Seal of Alabama
 State Auditor of Alabama
 The Blind Boys of Alabama
 Time in Alabama
 Tobacco in Alabama

References

External links 

Encyclopedia of Alabama – ..vers history, culture, geography, natural environment, and more.
Alabama.gov – Official website.
Alabama State Guide, from the Library of Congress
Alabama State Databases – Annotated list of searchable databases produced by Alabama state agencies and compiled by the Government Documents Roundtable of the American Library Association.
Alabama Association of Regional Councils
Energy Data & Statistics for Alabama- From the U.S. Department of Energy
TourAlabama.org – Alabama Department of Tourism and Travel
All About Alabama, at the Alabama Department of Archives and History
AlabamaMosaic, a digital repository of materials on Alabama's history, culture, places, and people
Digital Alabama, a repository of nonfiction and historical fiction  on Alabama's history, art, architecture, religions, culture, places, and people that helped shape the Alabama way of life
Code of Alabama 1975 – at the Alabama Legislature site

USGS real-time, geographic, and other scientific resources of Alabama
Alabama QuickFacts from the U.S. Census Bureau
Alabama State Fact Sheet from the U.S. Department of Agriculture
Alabama State Parks
National Parks of Alabama

Alabama
Alabama